Kim Do-hyeon may refer to:
 Kim Do-hyeon, better known by his alias Pine (gamer), South Korean Overwatch player
 Kim Do-hyeon (baseball), South Korean baseball player